The Joan Mott Prize Lecture is a prize lecture awarded annually by The Physiological Society in honour of Joan Mott.

Laureates
Laureates of the award have included:
 
 
 
 
 
 
 
 
 
 
 
  - Intestinal absorption of sugars and peptides: from textbook to surprises

References

Academic awards